Amherst Township is one of the eighteen townships of Lorain County, Ohio, United States. As of the 2010 census, the population was 6,844, down from 7,598 people at the 2000 census. In 2010, 5,728 of the population lived in the unincorporated portions of the township.

Geography
Located in northern Lorain County, it borders the following townships and cities:
Amherst - northwest
Lorain - northeast
Elyria Township - east
Elyria - southeast
Carlisle Township - southeast corner
New Russia Township - south
Henrietta Township - southwest corner
Brownhelm Township - west

The city of Amherst occupies what was northwestern Amherst Township, and part of the village of South Amherst lies in the southwestern part of the township.

Name and history
 It is the only township named "Amherst" statewide.
 Amherst Township was established as a judicially-independent township in 1830, and named after Amherst, New Hampshire.  It had been originally created as "Town(ship) number 6 in the 18th Range" (of the Connecticut Western Reserve); but prior to 1830, it was judicially attached to "Black River township" and originally in Huron County, Ohio, before Lorain County was created in 1822 and organized in 1824.  Its first pioneer-settlement began in 1811, when Jacob and Catherine Shupe settled in the northern section, soon constructing the first sawmill, frame house, and gristmill in the area.  Shupe's pioneering efforts aided greatly in spurring future local development.  Although many additional pioneers settled throughout the other portions of the township in the 1810s and 1820s, the actual downtown portion of the village of Amherst was not officially established/recorded until 1836. By the mid-20th-century, that village eventually encompassed most of the northern half of the original township.

Government
The township is governed by a three-member board of trustees, who are elected in November of odd-numbered years to a four-year term beginning on the following January 1. Two are elected in the year after the presidential election and one is elected in the year before it. There is also an elected township fiscal officer, who serves a four-year term beginning on April 1 of the year after the election, which is held in November of the year before the presidential election. Vacancies in the fiscal officership or on the board of trustees are filled by the remaining trustees.  The current trustees are Dennis Abraham, Neil Lynch, and David Urig.

References

External links

County website

Townships in Lorain County, Ohio
Townships in Ohio